Mutya is a Philippine fantasy series produced and aired by ABS-CBN based on Pablo S. Gomez's comic of the same name. The series introduced child actress Mutya Orquia. The series premiered from January 31, 2011 to May 6, 2011, replacing Noah on ABS-CBN's primetime slot. and was replaced by 100 Days to Heaven.

Orquia's portrayal of the titular mermaid received acclaim from critics and the show itself garnered high ratings according to KANTAR Media. Its pilot episode garnered 32.6% defeating its rival show Dwarfina in GMA-7. In addition to this, she was also nominated for Best New Female TV Personality in the 2011 PMPC Star Awards for TV and 2011 Gawad Tangi Awards for Best TV Child Performer.

This series is currently streaming on Jeepney TV YouTube Channel every 7:00 pm & 7:30 pm replacing Rosalka.

Series overview

Overview
Mutya (Mutya Orquia) a child mermaid, was the love child of Cordelia (Precious Lara Quigaman) a human, and Prinsipe Irvin (Alfred Vargas) the Prince of the seaworld kingdom. However, their relationship was forbidden as Irvin is set to be married with another royal mermaid, Nerissa (Niña Jose). Cordelia got pregnant at the time of their relationship, and was forced to give birth to the child. The child was born with an unknown disability, where her legs were attached to each other. Cordelia's mother, Delilah (Sandy Andolong), sees this, was horrified and she decided to abandon the child. She assigned Tonyo (Jayson Gainza) to take away the baby. However, Tonyo brought the child back to his home, treated her as their own and named her Mutya. As Mutya grows up, she was protected by her older brother Aries (Jairus Aquino), who has always been there for her. Mutya has still yet to realize that she is a mermaid. With her legs being attached to each other, it was mistaken as a disability although it was actually her mermaid tail slowly forming.

Cast and characters

Main cast
Mutya Orquia as Mutya/Prinsesa Mutya/Mutya Sardenas - A little girl who was mistakenly believed to have a disability with her feet attached to each other. She is the missing daughter of Haring Irvin and Cordelia.
Lara Quigaman as Cordelia "Ella" Sardenas - Mutya's mother who often seeks her long-lost daughter whom they believed she was dead. After she went to the doctor and heard that her daughter has a disability, she stopped looking, believing that the doctor tells enough evidence that her daughter is dead or alive.
Alfred Vargas as Prinsipe/Haring Irvin - The prince of the sea. After his father's death, he was imprisoned by the black mermaids and is hypnotized by Narissa's potions that makes him forget everything. After he realized this, he tried to stop the black mermaids from ruling the entire ocean. He learns that Mutya was his real daughter, not Chabita. The kataw manages to fight the black mermaids. With the help of his daughter's singing, he got the trident from them and rules the ocean.
Jairus Aquino as Aries - He took care of Mutya as his own. He knows who is her real mother and father are after dreaming it. He manages to keep it a secret because he is afraid to lose her.

Supporting cast
Malou Crisologo as Reyna Octopina  - The queen of the Black mermaids, the mother of Nerissa and the grandmother of Chabita. She had killed many humans, just to find the black pearl. She is one of the main antagonists of the series, the other one is her daughter Nerissa.
Ahron Villena as Zale - Irvin's cousin, who loved Nerissa and betrayed him. He is the real father of Chabita.
Niña Jose as Prinsesa Nerissa  - The princess of the black mermaids. She became a fool because of her love for Irvin, she would do anything for Irvin. She is the mother of Chabita, In the end, she saved Irvin from her mother who tried to kill him, and she slept for a long time but was healed by Mutya's voice. She is one of the main antagonists of the series.
Gary Lim as Lolo Sheldon - Haring Merrick and Irvin's hand. He always helped Irvin in his problems and helped him to remember everything when he had amnesia.
Sandy Andolong as Madam Delilah Sardenas - Mutya's grandmother who was the one who assigned Tonyo to take the child away. She has a big business and she uses Mutya's singing to have more catches.
Amy Nobleza as Chabita - the daughter of Nerissa and Zale.
Jayson Gainza as Tonyo - the one who was assigned to take Mutya away. After the child was sprinkled with water, it immediately made its first cry, encouraging Tonyo to keep it. He is Aries's father and he died when Octopina drowns him.
Tess Antonio as Ester - Aries's mother. She died when she was left in Octopina's island.
Ogie Diaz as Rommel
Yen Santos as Melinda
Venus Raj as Mikki
Cacai Bautista as Lagring
Michael Conan as Rudy
Lassy as Mameng
Paolo Serrano as Walter
Carlene Aguilar as Undin
Eda Nolan as Brigit

Special participation
Pen Medina as Haring Merrick
Izzy Canillo as Young Aries
Carlo Lacana as Young Dennis
April Sun as Sirena
Justin Gonzales as Sireno
Veyda Inoval as Jasmin
Jovic Susim as Igat
Joe Vargas as Lumot
Jubail Andres as Eskale
Allan de Paz as Tatang

Episodes

See also
List of programs broadcast by ABS-CBN
List of shows previously aired by ABS-CBN
List of ABS-CBN drama series

References

External links
Official website

ABS-CBN drama series
Television series by Dreamscape Entertainment Television
2011 Philippine television series debuts
2011 Philippine television series endings
Mermaids in television
Filipino-language television shows
Television shows set in the Philippines
2010s children's television series